Alexander Aloysius "Duke" Reilley (August 25, 1884 – March 4, 1968), nicknamed "Midget",  was a Major League Baseball left fielder who played for one season. He played for the Cleveland Naps for 20 games during the 1909 Cleveland Naps season.

External links

1884 births
1968 deaths
Major League Baseball left fielders
Cleveland Naps players
Baseball players from Illinois
Erie Fishermen players
Erie Sailors players
Columbus Senators players
Lima Cigarmakers players
Zanesville Potters players
Indianapolis Indians players
Toronto Maple Leafs (International League) players
Louisville Colonels (minor league) players
Salt Lake City Bees players
St. Paul Saints (AA) players
St. Joseph Saints players
Bridgeport Americans players